Khujeh Tup (also Romanized as Khūjeh Tūp) is a village in Gorganbuy Rural District, in the Central District of Aqqala County, Golestan Province, Iran. At the 2006 census, its population was 169, in 33 families.

References 

Populated places in Aqqala County